The New Orleans, Texas and Mexico Railway was a constituent element of the Missouri Pacific Railroad.

References

Missouri Pacific Railroad
Defunct railroad companies of the United States
Standard gauge railways in the United States